Three by-elections were held in the Tongan electorates of Tongatapu 4, Tongatapu 6, and Tongatapu 7 on 3 November 2022. The by-elections were triggered by the unseating of cabinet ministers Tatafu Moeaki, Poasi Tei, and Sione Sangster Saulala for bribery following the 2021 Tongan general election. The by-elections were won by Mateni Tapueluelu (Tongatapu 4), Dulcie Tei (Tongatapu 6), and Paula Piukala (Tongatapu 7).

Candidate registration for the by-elections was held on September 5 and 6, resulting in five candidates for Tongatapu 4 and Tongatapu 6, and three for Tongatapu 7.

Candidates for Tongatapu 4 were former MPs Mateni Tapueluelu and ʻIsileli Pulu, Viliami 'Alamameita Takau, Toutai 'Ulupano, and 'Etika Cocker.

Candidates for Tongatapu 6 were Tahifisi Vehikite, Sione Talanoa Fifita, Fane Fotu Fituafe, Sepeti Vakameilalo, and Dulcie Elaine Tei.

Candidates for Tongatapu 7 were Feletiliki Fa'otusia, Paula Piveni Piukala, and Kilisitina Saulala.

References

By-elections
By-elections to the Legislative Assembly of Tonga
Tonga
Tonga
Tongatapu